Jackson Van Riel Dalcanal (born 26 September 1989), commonly known as Jackson Samurai, is a Brazilian futsal player who plays as a winger for Joinville and the Brazilian national futsal team.

References

External links
Liga Nacional de Futsal profile

1989 births
Living people
Brazilian men's futsal players
ADC Intelli players